Charting may refer to:
Chart, graphical representation of data
Nautical chart, process of building a chart of water bodies
Technical analysis, term used in finance
Music chart, ordered list of music sales

See also
Chart (disambiguation)